Periya Veetu Pannakkaran is a 1990 Indian Tamil-language film, directed by N. K. Viswanathan and produced by Kalyani Murugan. The film stars Karthik, Kanaka, M. N. Nambiar and S. S. Chandran. The film's score was composed by Ilaiyaraaja.

Plot 

She is the daughter of a very rich big family . In the same village Karthik is the grandson of a very poor farmer there. He is a do gooder and is always rubbing the villains ( kanaka's cousins ) the wrong way. When they both decide to get married after a few teasings and duets, her family refuses and gets him beaten. Nambiar who resides in the next village adopts him . After hearing his story, he extends his proposal to Kanaka's family who still refuses despite Kartik now having millions in his name thanx to Nambiar. The village horse festival is announced. After much violence and fights, Karthik and Kanaka get together and he wins the competition.

Cast
Karthik 
Kanaka 
M. N. Nambiar 
S S Chandran 
Ganthimathi 
Kovai Sarala 
S. N. Lakshmi
Y. Vijaya
Sathyapriya
Sangili Murugan 
Senthamarai
Senthil 
Vijayakumar

Soundtrack
The music was composed by Ilaiyaraaja.

The song "Nikkattumaa Pogattuma" was composed in raga Vachaspati and the songs, "Muthu Muthu Medai" and "Malligaiye Malligaiye" were composed in Sarasangi

References

External links
 

1990 films
Films scored by Ilaiyaraaja
1990s Tamil-language films
Films directed by N. K. Vishwanathan